Janez Zupanc (born 8 December 1986) is a Slovenian rower. He competed in the men's quadruple sculls event at the 2008 Summer Olympics.

References

External links
 

1986 births
Living people
Slovenian male rowers
Olympic rowers of Slovenia
Rowers at the 2008 Summer Olympics
People from the Municipality of Krško
21st-century Slovenian people